= Scott Chaskey =

American organic farmer and author

Scott Chaskey is an American organic farmer and author.

== Books ==
- Seedtime On the History, Husbandry, Politics, and Promise of Seeds (Rodale, 2014)
- This Common Ground Seasons on an Organic Farm (Viking, 2005)
- Stars are Suns (Stoneman Press, 1993)
